The 1930 season of the Paraguayan Primera División, the top category of Paraguayan football, was played by 14 teams. The national champions were Libertad.

Results

Standings

External links
Paraguay 1930 season at RSSSF

Paraguayan Primera División seasons
Para
1